This is a list of Australian places named by James Cook. James Cook was the first navigator to chart most of the Australian east coast, one of the last major coastlines in the world unknown to Europeans at the time. Cook named many bays, capes and other geographic features, nearly all of which are still gazetted, and most of which are still in use today, although in some places the spelling is slightly different. This is a list of the placenames he used in his first voyage listed from south to north as described on his 1773 chart and in his journals.

List

See also
List of New Zealand places named by James Cook

References

 The Endeavour journal (1) and The Endeavour journal (2), as kept by James Cook — digitised and held by the National Library of Australia
 
Voyages of Captain Cook, 1st voyage
 The South Seas Project Maps and online editions of the Journals of James Cook's First Pacific Voyage, 1768–71. Includes full text of journals kept by Cook, Joseph Banks and Sydney Parkinson, as well as the complete text of John Hawkesworth's 1773 Account of Cook's first voyage.

Names of places in Australia

Cook